Percy Benjamin Allen  (30 June 1913 – 19 September 1992) was a New Zealand politician of the National Party.

Biography

Allen was born at Auckland in 1913, the son of Charles Percival Allen. He received his education at Te Aroha School and Rotorua Boys' High School. In 1939, he married Peggy Donaldson, the daughter of William Donaldson. They had one son and one daughter. He fished and played golf for recreation.

He participated in World War II and served in the Pacific, Italy and Egypt, where he was wounded at El Alamein. He had the rank of major at the end of the war.  He had his own plastering business after the war.

Allen was on the Rotorua RSA and on the Rotorua Borough Council.

He represented the  electorate in Parliament from 1957, when he won the  after the resignation of Bill Sullivan, until , when he retired because of ill-health.

He was a Cabinet minister from 1963 to 1972 in the Second National Government. In 1969, he became Minister of Electricity. When Jack Marshall became Prime Minister in 1972, Allen maintained the Works portfolio, relinquished Electricity, but gained the role as Minister of Police. His ministerial roles finished when the Third Labour Government took over on 8 December 1972.

He was appointed a Companion of the Queen's Service Order for public services in the 1976 New Year Honours,. and was awarded the New Zealand 1990 Commemoration Medal. He died in Whakatane on 19 September 1992.

Notes

References

1913 births
1992 deaths
Companions of the Queen's Service Order
New Zealand National Party MPs
Members of the Cabinet of New Zealand
New Zealand military personnel of World War II
New Zealand Army officers
Members of the New Zealand House of Representatives
Local politicians in New Zealand
New Zealand MPs for North Island electorates
People educated at Rotorua Boys' High School
People from Auckland
20th-century New Zealand politicians